Barbados competed at the 2004 Summer Paralympics in Athens, Greece. The team included one athlete, but won no medals.

Sports

Cycling

Men's road

See also
Barbados at the Paralympics
Barbados at the 2004 Summer Olympics

References 

Nations at the 2004 Summer Paralympics
2004
Summer Paralympics